The French women's national ice hockey team represents France at international ice hockey tournaments, including the International Ice Hockey Federation (IIHF) Women's World Championship. The women's national team is controlled by Fédération Française de Hockey sur Glace (FFHG). France had 2,622 female ice hockey players registered with the IIHF in 2022, an increase of more than 250% over the 952 players recorded in 2011. , the French women's national team is ranked twelfth in the world; they have ranked as high as tenth, first in 2018.

Tournament record

Olympic Games

The women's team of France has never qualified for an Olympic tournament.

World Championship
1999 – Finished in 11th place (3rd in Lower Division)
2000 – Finished in 13th place (5th in Lower Division)
2001 – Finished in 13th place (5th in Division I)
2003 – 4th in Division I (Top Division not Played)
2004 – Finished in 13th place (4th in Division I)
2005 – Finished in 12th place (4th in Division I)
2007 – Finished in 12th place (3rd in Division I)
2008 – Finished in 13th place (4th in Division I)
2009 – Finished in 15th place (6th in Division I and demoted to Division II)
2011 – Finished in 15th place (2nd in Division II)
2012 – Finished in 17th place (3rd in Division IB)
2013 – Finished in 15th place (1st in Division IB and promoted to Division IA)
2014 – Finished in 12th place (4th in Division IA)
2015 – Finished in 11th place (3rd in Division IA)
2016 – Finished in 10th place (2nd in Division IA)
2017 – Finished in 14th place (6th in Division IA)
2018 – Finished in 10th place (1st in Division IA and promoted to Top division)
2019 – Finished in 10th place (demoted to Division IA)
2020 – Cancelled due to the COVID-19 pandemic
2021 – Cancelled due to the COVID-19 pandemic
2022 – Finished in 11th place (1st in Division IA and promoted to Top division)

European Championship
1991 – Finished in 7th place
1993 – Finished in 9th place (3rd in Group B)
1995 – Finished in 11th place (5th in Group B)
1996 – Finished in 11th place (5th in Group B)

Team

2022 roster
Roster for the 2022 IIHF Women's World Championship Division I Group A. Player age at start of tournament on 24 April 2022. 

Head coach: Grégory Tarlé

Team captaincy history
 Marion Allemoz, –present

Head coaches
 Patrick Adin, 1998–99
 James Tibbetts, 1999–2000
 Stéphane Sabourin, 2000–01
 Christer Eriksson, 2002–03
 Renaud Jacquin, 2003–2005
 Christine Duchamp, 2006–2013
 Grégory Tarlé, 2013–present

References

External links
 
IIHF profile
National Teams of Ice Hockey

Ice hockey in France
Women's national ice hockey teams in Europe
Women's national sports teams of France
1989 establishments in France